Jean Tordeur (5 September 1920 – 27 January 2010) was a Belgian writer writing in French.  He was the cultural critic of the daily newspaper Le Soir (Brussels).  Tordeur was a member of the Académie royale de langue et de littérature françaises de Belgique.

Works
 Conservateur des charges et autre poèmes, Clepsydre, Éditions de la Différence.
 Foreword of A la recherche d'une enfance by Suzanne Lilar", 1979, Bruxelles, Éditions Jacques Antoine.
  Introduction to Journal de l'analogiste by Suzanne Lilar, 1979, Paris, Bernard Grasset, 
 Foreword of Écrit à Léglise by Maurice Grevisse, 1984, Neufchâteau, Lions club de Neufchâteau
 Foreword of Faux passeports by Charles Plisnier, 1984, Bruxelles, Éditions Jacques Antoine, 
 Portrait of author, Poèmes choisis by Jean Mogin, 1995, Bruxelles, Académie royale de langue et de littérature françaises, 
  Foreword of Trois-quarts de siècle de lettres françaises en Belgique by Jacques Detemmerman et Jean Lacroix, 1995, avant-propos de Jean Tordeur, Brussel, Koninklijke Bibliotheek Albert I
 Foreword of le multiple by Jules Destrée, Bruxelles, 1996, Académie royale de langue et de littérature françaises, 
 L'air des lettres, 2000, Bruxelles, Académie royale de langue et de littérature françaises, Foreword by Jacques De Decker, 
 Norge de tout jour 2001, Tournai, La renaissance du livre
 Foreword of Poésie by Roger Cantraine, 2002, Leuze, Editions de l'Acanthe,

References

External links
Voice of Jean Tordeur
L'Air des lettres

People from Schaerbeek
1920 births
2010 deaths
Belgian writers in French
Belgian journalists
Male journalists